The Neta V (哪吒V) is an electric subcompact crossover produced by Hozon Auto under the Neta (Nezha) brand, a Chinese all-electric car marque, manufactured by the Zhejiang Hezhong New Energy Automobile Company.

Overview

The Neta V was launched in 2020. The Neta V is a battery electric vehicle equipped with a Lithium-ion battery delivering a range of 401 km (251 miles) rated by NEDC. At the same time, the electric crossover accelerates from 0 to 50 km/h in 3.9 seconds. In November 2021, Hozon and PTT announced that in the future, PTT will work with Hozon Auto to expand its business in the Thai market. The Hozon Neta V in right-hand-drive form will initially take the lead in Hozon's expansion into Thailand. Hozon will use Thailand as its base for expansion into the broader ASEAN region.

References

2010s cars
Cars introduced in 2020
Front-wheel-drive vehicles
Mini sport utility vehicles
Crossover sport utility vehicles
Production electric cars